A church covenant is a declaration, which some churches draw up and call their members to sign, in which their duties as church members towards God and their fellow believers are outlined. It is a fraternal agreement, freely endorsed, that establishes what are, according to the Holy Scriptures, the duties of a Christian and the responsibilities which each church member pledges themselves to honour.

History 

The idea of a church covenant is an expression of the free-church ecclesiology and it issues from within the context of the English Puritanism, becoming afterwards one of the characteristic traits of the Baptist churches.

In the 16th century, the Church in England, confronted with the teaching of the Bible under the impulse of continental Protestantism, engaged itself in a reformation which disconnected it from many persuasions, practices and traditions of Roman Catholicism. In particular, from the time of Henry VIII's divorce from Catherine of Aragon and subsequent marriage to Queen Anne Boleyn, it reflected on the meaning, structure and function of being a church and was involved in heated discussions on the measure according to which this reformation must occur.

To the end of the reign of Edward VI the model of the Reformed Genevan ecclesiology prevailed. After the parenthesis of Mary I, in which Roman Catholicism was restored, with Elizabeth I a line of compromise prevailed and lasted until the time of Charles I when, caused by the English Civil War, Calvinist Presbyterianism was reintroduced. With Charles II, the Elizabethan settlement was reconfirmed and again imposed a compromise line between Catholicism and Protestantism.

This Elizabethan compromise was opposed by many theologians and preachers who exerted considerable pressure so that, courageously, the church was finally purified from all Roman Catholic doctrines and practices unsupported by the Bible (from this the term Puritanism is mainly drawn). The resistance and refusal, nevertheless, of the institution to carry forward these reforms, considered by now unsupportable for the population, led some to force the situation and establish independent Christian congregations (from this the term Separatism is created) which, eventually will gave birth to the churches which are now known as Congregationalist and Baptist.

A new ecclesiology thus matured in this context. It was different from the traditional one, the one used to the concept of territorial churches subdivided in parishes, "people's church", confused and allied with the state and governed by clerical hierarchies (episcopacy). It was "the free-church ecclesiology", in which the church is mainly a free and voluntary local association of committed Christians, democratically self-managed, distinct and independent from the State. They are Christians bound one to the others on the basis of a covenant and affirming a Confession of faith. In the case of the Baptist movement, believers' baptism is understood as the seal of such a commitment towards God and one to the other. This movement, consequently, gets closer and closer to the doctrines and experiences first of the Anabaptists, then of Mennonites.

The concept of the church as God's people bound by a covenant, although not new in the history of Christianity, was developed extensively by the Strasbourg reformer Martin Bucer (1491–1551) and taken up in Puritanism by Richard Fitz (1570), who established in London by 1567 a Christian congregation separated from the officially sanctioned Anglican church. He expressed the aspiration, shared by many, to establish a church free from the State interference, characterised by what are understood by the signs of a true church: biblical preaching, New Testament sacraments, and ordered by a serious discipline. This church must be formed, Fitz wrote, on the basis of a voluntary covenant:

Robert Browne (1540–1630) theorized how God's faithful people are called to separate themselves from the unfaithful ones, and that the only way to form a true church is, for believers, to agree together in a covenant, the signing of which is expected by all those who wish to be part of it. This way God's people would submit to the authority of Christ, becoming a real church. Signing this contract would become the sign of the genuine Christian Henry Barrowe (1550–1593) took up and further elaborated on Browne's ideas, linking the local church covenant to the eternal covenant of God, emphasizing the consistent application of church discipline for those who infringe this covenant. In the Separatist Confession of Faith of 1596, article 33, the church is thus described:

Records being rather scarce, we do not know how much the separatist ideas in fact do influence John Smyth's thought, main inspirer of the Baptist movement in England. Through great part of his career, Smyth believes that a local church covenant is the most appropriate answer to God's offer of the covenant of grace. He writes "to be debtor, in these ideas, to the separatist "ancient brothers". Smyth declares that the true church members are "the saints only" and that these must convene in a local church through a fraternal covenant. From this perspectyive, Smyth has much in common with the Anabaptist persuasion that the best way to relate to God is through a community of believers. Later, as Smyth gets closer to the Mennonites, he does not any more emphasize this concept.

The idea of church covenant becomes prominent among the puritans that settle in America. In 1648, in Cambridge (Massachusetts) John Cotton, Richard Mather, e Ralph Partridge draw out "a model for the government of the church" in which the reasoning thus follows: "this visible union cannot be established by mere 'faith,' for that is invisible; nor by a 'bare profession' of faith, for that does not make a person part of one particular church or another; nor by 'cohabitation' (i.e., living in the same community), for "atheists and Infidels may dwell together with believers"; nor by "baptism," since baptism by itself does not make a person a part of a particular church. What establishes the visible union of a group of believers into a church is that they make a covenant with each other to be the church".

See also
 List of Christian creeds

References

Further reading
Jason, K. Lee, The Theology of John Smyth: Puritan, Separatist, Baptist, Mennonite (Mercer University Press, 2003)
Roger Hayden: English Baptist History and Heritare (Baptist Union of Great Britain, Didcot, 2005)
Nigel G. Wright, Free Church - Free State, The Positive Baptist Vision (Paternoster, Milton Keynes, 2005)

Ecclesiology
Protestantism in the United Kingdom
Anglican theology and doctrine